The Midland Flyers are a Canadian junior ice hockey team based in Midland, Ontario.  They play in the Provincial Junior Hockey League and were former members of the Georgian Mid-Ontario Junior C Hockey League.

History
In 1985, the Centennials won the Georgian Bay championship and wheeled their way through to the Clarence Schmalz Cup final where their ran into the Great Lakes Junior C Hockey League's Belle River Canadiens.  The Canadiens took the All-Ontario final 4-games-to-1.

In 1994, the Georgian Bay Junior C Hockey League merged with the Mid-Ontario Junior C Hockey League to create the Georgian Mid-Ontario Junior C Hockey League.  That same year, the Midland Centennials decided to change their name to the Midland Flyers.

In 1999, the team chose to change its name to the Midland Thunder.  The team was very competitive.  Despite not winning any league championships, the Thunder maintained a winning record and kept near the top of the league.

The 2002 seasons saw two things happen.  In 2002, the Midland Thunder once again became the Midland Flyers.  Also, 2002 was the year where the franchise's winning ways seemed to have disappeared.  In the five seasons since Midland became the Flyers, the team has not won ten games in one season.

The 2005-06 season saw the team bottom out with a completely winless season.  The eighth seeded Flyers drew the wrath of the first seed Penetang Kings who swept the Flyers in their first of six rounds of playoffs to win the Clarence Schmalz Cup as All-Ontario Champions.

The 2006-07 was a mild improvement, but barely enough to know that the Midland Flyers are in a healthy place.  For the second year in a row, the Flyers drew the Penetang Kings in the first round of the playoffs which Kings beat the Flyers 4-games-to-none to win the league quarter-final.  Again, the Kings went on to win the league and another Clarence Schmalz Cup.

2012-2013 season
In the 2013 GMOJHL playoffs, the Flyers defeated the Caledon Golden Hawks in 5 games and the Stayner Siskins in 5 games to reach their first league final since 1986. Midland faces the five-time consecutive champion Alliston Hornets in the final.

Season-by-season standings

1973–1977
2000–2004
2004–Present

2013 offseason
Midland Flyers announced that head coach Ed Garinger has resigned his current position with the Midland Flyers and has joined the Alliston Hornets as head coach. .Midland Flyers have hired Luke Dubbin as head coach along with Kyle Horzempa as assistant coach.  Gerry Asselin will return as well as general manager and team president.

2014 offseason
Midland Flyers announced that head coach Luke Dubbin was stepping down and have hired Dave Steele as their new head coach.  Dave was an assistant coach with the Waterloo Siskins of the Greater Ontario Junior (B) Hockey League the previous season.  Waterloo had won their Midwestern Conference Championship (first in 20 years).  Gerry Asselin is remaining as general manager and president.

Clarence Schmalz Cup appearances
1985: Belle River Canadiens defeated Midland Centennials 4-games-to-1

Notable alumni
Sandy McCarthy

References

External links
Flyers' OHA Webpage

Georgian Mid-Ontario Junior C Hockey League teams
Midland, Ontario